Danoff is a surname. Notable people with the surname include:

Bettye Danoff (1923–2011), American golfer
Bill Danoff (born 1946), American songwriter and singer
Owen Danoff (born 1989), American singer-songwriter
William Danoff (born 1959/1960), American money manager

See also
Daroff